Willow Springs is a village located around a set of former springs (no longer flowing) in Kern County, California, United States.

Willow Springs International Motorsports Park is approximately two miles east of the original village of Willow Springs.

An underground grid storage project is planned near the Whirlwind Substation.

History
A post office operated at Willow Springs from 1909 to 1918.

The local springs provided water for Native American settlements and early travelers.  Willow Springs was an important stop on freight and stagecoach lines. Most of the masonry buildings were built around 1900 by Ezra Hamilton. The site is now registered as California Historical Landmark #103.

See also
 California Historical Landmarks in Kern County
California Historical Landmark

References

Reference bibliography 

Populated places in the Mojave Desert
Former Native American populated places in California
Unincorporated communities in Kern County, California
Springs of California
Unincorporated communities in California